Kenneth Cochrane Raikes (9 May 1889 – 20 November 1973) was a Welsh cricketer active from 1908 to 1934, making six appearances in first-class cricket. Born at Malpas, Monmouthshire, Raikes was a right-handed batsman and bowler of unknown style, who played most of his cricket at minor counties level for Monmouthshire.

Cricket career
Having played cricket for Shrewsbury School, Raikes made his debut in minor counties cricket for Monmouthshire against Carmarthenshire in the 1908 Minor Counties Championship, with him playing a further match in that season against Glamorgan. Following three matches in 1909, Raikes established himself as a regular in the Monmouthshire team from 1910 onwards, typically playing half a dozen matches per season in the Minor Counties Championship prior to the First World War.

Following the end of the war, Raikes resumed his minor counties career for Monmouthshire in 1921, once again playing regularly for the county. He made his debut in first-class cricket in 1925 when he was selected to play for Wales against the Marylebone Cricket Club (MCC) at Lord's. He played a further first-class match against Ireland in that same season, before playing two further matches against the same opposition in 1926. He played for Wales against the touring New Zealanders in 1927, before playing a final first-class match against the MCC in 1929. In his six first-class appearances for Wales, Raikes scored 135 runs at an average of 16.87, with a high score of 50. With the ball, he took 18 wickets at an average of 27.88, with one bowling innings of significance against Ireland in 1925 when he took 7/28 from sixteen overs. He continued to play minor counties cricket for Monmouthshire until 1934, Monmouthshire's final season in the Minor Counties Championship. Raikes made 116 appearances for the county.

Personal life

References

External links
Kenneth Raikes at ESPNcricinfo
Kenneth Raikes at CricketArchive

1889 births
1973 deaths
Sportspeople from Newport, Wales
People educated at Shrewsbury School
Welsh cricketers
Monmouthshire cricketers
Wales cricketers
British Army personnel of World War I